Ekmel Özbay is a Turkish professor of  Electrical and Electronics Engineering and Physics Departments at Bilkent University and the director of the Nanotechnology Research Center, and Space Technologies Research Center (BILUZAY) in Ankara.

Biography
Ekmel Özbay was born on March 25, 1966, in Ankara, Turkey. He received his B.S. degree in electrical engineering from the Middle East Technical University, Ankara, Turkey in 1987. He received his M.S. and Ph.D. degrees in electrical engineering from Stanford University in 1989 and 1992.

From 1992 to 1993, Özbay worked as a postdoctoral research associate at Stanford  University. His research in Stanford focused on high speed resonant tunneling and optoelectronic devices.

Between 1993 and 1995, he worked as a scientist in the Department of Energy's Ames National Laboratory at Iowa State University in the area of photonic band gap materials.

He joined Bilkent University (Ankara, Turkey) in 1995, where he is currently a full professor in the physics and electrical electronics engineering departments. His research areas include metamaterials, photonic crystals,
MOCVD growth, fabrication and characterization of nanoelectronic and nanophotonic GaN/AlGaN devices, and high performance near-infrared semiconductor photodetectors and lasers.

Since 2002, he is a topical editor of the journal Optics Letters.  He has published 410 journal articles and 435 international conference proceedings. His publications have received more than 11500 citations according to the Web of Science. Özbay holds 2 patents in the area of photonic crystals. His recent review article on plasmonics appeared as an invited review article in Jan. 13th 2006 issue of Science. Currently, he is principal investigator and executive committee member of 3 EU-FP projects: STREP project EU-DALHM (Development and Analysis of Left Handed Materials), NoE-PHOREMOST (Nanophotonics to realize Molecular-Scale Technologies), and NoE-METAMORPHOSE (MetaMaterials Organized for radio, millimeter wave, and PHOtonic Superlattice Engineering). He is currently acting as the national delegate for Turkey in the program committee of EU-NMP (nanotechnologies, manufacturing and processes) which is in the process of preparing the workprogramme for EU-FP7. Besides the EU projects, he is principal investigator on 25 national projects supported by various funding agencies. He has worked with various high-tech companies in USA, Europe and Turkey.

Awards
Özbay was the 1997 recipient of the Adolph Lomb Medal of the Optical Society of America and in 2005 of the European Union Descartes Science award. He is also the recipient of the 1995 Parlar Foundation young scientist, 1996 Tugac foundation technology development, 1997 TUBITAK young scientist, and 1998 Sedat Simavi Foundation Science awards.

Personal life
Outside of the workplace, Özbay has a number of children. He's also a keen and well-credited sportsman, having participating in Turkish open Tennis events and regional competitions.

References

Turkish scientists
Turkish physicists
Turkish nanotechnologists
Metamaterials scientists
Turkish electrical engineers
Turkish materials scientists
Academic staff of Bilkent University
Stanford University School of Engineering alumni
Middle East Technical University alumni
Recipients of TÜBİTAK Science Award
Members of the Turkish Academy of Sciences
Living people
1966 births
Optical engineers
Electrical engineering academics
Turkish engineering academics